Hans Henninger (24 February 1905 – 15 May 1937) was a German stage and film actor.

Selected filmography
 Here's Berlin (1932)
 Traum von Schönbrunn (1932)
 Sacred Waters (1932)
 Here's Berlin (1932)
 Hermine and the Seven Upright Men (1935)
 Marriage Strike (1935)
 Winter Night's Dream (1935)
 Anschlag auf Schweda (1935)
 Family Parade (1936)
 The Traitor (1936)
 The Hunter of Fall (1936)
 Dangerous Crossing (1937)
 Such Great Foolishness (1937)

External links

1905 births
1937 deaths
German male film actors
German male stage actors
People from Pforzheim
20th-century German male actors
1937 suicides
Suicides in Germany